Tenmile Creek is a stream in the U.S. state of Georgia. It is a tributary to the Altamaha River.

The name is sometimes spelled out as "Ten Mile Creek".

References

Rivers of Georgia (U.S. state)
Rivers of Appling County, Georgia